The Ligier JS53 is a sports prototype race car, designed, developed, and built by Ligier, in collaboration with Onroak Automotive, conforming to FIA Group CN regulations, to compete in sports car racing and hillclimb events, since 2012.

References 

Sports prototypes
Ligier racing cars